The 2006–07 season was the 85th season of competitive association football and third season in the Football Conference played by York City Football Club, a professional football club based in York, North Yorkshire, England. They finished in fourth place in the 24-team 2006–07 Conference National, qualifying for the play-offs, in which they were eliminated in the semi-final by Morecambe.

York entered the 2006–07 FA Cup in the fourth qualifying round, beating Newcastle Benfield (Bay Plastics) away before losing at home to Bristol City in the first round. They were knocked out in the first round of the 2006–07 FA Trophy, being beaten by their eventual play-off opponents Morecambe.

28 players made at least one appearance in nationally organised first-team competition, and there were 12 different goalscorers. Striker Craig Farrell played in all 51 first-team matches over the season. Clayton Donaldson finished as leading goalscorer with 26 goals, of which 24 came in league competition, one came in the FA Cup one came in the FA Trophy. The winner of the Clubman of the Year award was Neal Bishop.

Background and pre-season

New home and away kits were brought in for the first time in two years. The home kit included red shirts with a white collar, bar a section under the neck which was red, and white trims on the sleeves, white shorts and red socks. The away kit comprised yellow shirts with a green collar, bar a section under the neck which was yellow, and white trims on the sleeves, blue shorts and blue socks. CLP Industries continued as shirt sponsors for the second successive season.

Match details
Dates and attendances are sourced by Batters. League positions are sourced by Statto. The remaining information is referenced individually.

Conference National

League table (part)

FA Cup

FA Trophy

Conference National play-offs

Transfers

In

 Brackets around club names denote the player's contract with that club had expired before he joined York.

Out

 Brackets around club names denote the player joined that club after his York contract expired.

Loans in

Loans out

Appearances and goals
Source:

Numbers in parentheses denote appearances as substitute.
Players with names struck through and marked  left the club during the playing season.
Players with names in italics and marked * were on loan from another club for the whole of their season with York.
Players listed with no appearances have been in the matchday squad but only as unused substitutes.
Key to positions: GK – Goalkeeper; DF – Defender; MF – Midfielder; FW – Forward

See also
List of York City F.C. seasons

References

2006-07
2006–07 Football Conference by team
Foot